Onychocerus scorpio is a species of beetle in the family Cerambycidae. It was described by Fabricius in 1781.

References

Anisocerini
Beetles described in 1781